Florence Court Forest Park is a forest of Northern Ireland.

Size and location 

The forest is located on the north east shoulder of Cuilcagh mountain and covers an area of 1,200 hectares. The forest adjoins the National Trust property and Florence Court House.

History 
Florence Court is named after the wife of Sir John Cole, who first built a house on the site in the early 18th century. The present house with a view over Benaughlin Mountain is believed to have been built by his son John, afterwards the 1st Lord Mount Florence. The wings and pavilions were added to the mid-18th century block around 1770 by William Cole, 1st Earl of Enniskillen. In 1955 the main building was struck by fire. Quick thinking by rescuers, who drilled holes in the floor, saved the dining room ceiling, with its cherubs and birds. The rest of the house and the plasterwork after the manner of Robert West has been restored.

References 

Forests and woodlands of Northern Ireland
Parks in County Fermanagh